Job 26 is the 26th chapter of the Book of Job in the Hebrew Bible or the Old Testament of the Christian Bible. The book is anonymous; most scholars believe it was written around 6th century BCE. This chapter records the speech of Job, which belongs to the Dialogue section of the book, comprising Job 3:1–31:40.

Text
The original text is written in Hebrew language. This chapter is divided into 14 verses.

Textual witnesses
Some early manuscripts containing the text of this chapter in Hebrew are of the Masoretic Text, which includes the Aleppo Codex (10th century), and Codex Leningradensis (1008).

There is also a translation into Koine Greek known as the Septuagint, made in the last few centuries BC; some extant ancient manuscripts of this version include Codex Vaticanus (B; B; 4th century), Codex Sinaiticus (S; BHK: S; 4th century), and Codex Alexandrinus (A; A; 5th century).

Analysis
The structure of the book is as follows:
The Prologue (chapters 1–2)
The Dialogue (chapters 3–31)
The Verdicts (32:1–42:6)
The Epilogue (42:7–17)

Within the structure, chapter 26 is grouped into the Dialogue section with the following outline:
Job's Self-Curse and Self-Lament (3:1–26)
Round One (4:1–14:22)
Round Two (15:1–21:34)
Round Three (22:1–27:23)
Eliphaz (22:1–30)
Job (23:1–24:25)
Bildad (25:1–6)
Job (26:1–27:23)
A Strong Rebuke of the Friends (26:1–4)
Praise for God's Majestic Power (26:5–14)
Insisting on His Integrity (27:1–6)
Offering to Instruct the Wicked (27:7–12)
The Fate of the Wicked (27:13–23)
Interlude – A Poem on Wisdom (28:1–28)
Job's Summing Up (29:1–31:40)

The Dialogue section is composed in the format of poetry with distinctive syntax and grammar. Comparing the three cycles of debate, the third (and final) round can be seen as 'incomplete', because there is no speech from Zophar and the speech by Bildad is very short (6 verses only), which may indicate as a symptom of disintegration of the friends' arguments. Job's final speech in the third cycle of debate mainly comprises chapters 26 to 27, but in the silence of his friends, Job continues his speech until chapter 31. Chapter 26 can be divided into two parts:
Job's rebuke to his friends: rejection to Bildad's arguments (verses 1–4)
Job's praise for God's majectic power (verses 5–14)

Job rebukes his friends (26:1–4)
Job focuses the first part of his speech to challenge Bildad's arguments by asking him to show how Bildad has helped someone who has no power nor strength (verse 2), or advised someone who has no wisdom, or caused anyone to experience abundant success; all of these evoke no answer from Bildad.  Job previously clarifies that wisdom, power and strength belong to God (Job 12:13–16), but none of these was in Bildad's speeches. The allusion in verse 4 refers to Eliphaz's words in Job 4:15, which were echoed by Bildad in his last speech (Job 25:4), implying that none of these statements came from God or reliable sources. At this point, Job ceases to address his friends and focuses his attention to the character of God.

Verse 4
[Job said:] "To whom have you uttered words?
And whose spirit came from you?"
"To whom": translated from the Hebrew preposition and the interrogative , ʾet mi", which can be translated as "with who[se help]?", or if taken as an accusative particle introducing the indirect object, can be rendered as "for whom did you utter…"..
"Came from you": in Hebrew literally "has gone out from you.".

Job praises God's majestic power (26:5–14)
This section contains Job's praise to God, emphasizing his belief in the big view of God controlling his world, although he cannot understand how his suffering can be part of God's good plan. God's authority covers even the dead people, which cannot hide from God (explained using three different terms for the dead: "shades/ghost" (verse 5a; cf. Proverbs 2:18; 9:18; Psalm 88:10), "Sheol" (verse 6a, "place of the dead") and "Abaddon" (verse 6b, "the plaace of destruction"). God also controls the mythological forces of chaos, such as "Rahab" (verse 12b; cf. Job 9:13) and the fleeing serpent (verse 13b), in anticipation of YHWH's second speech (chapters 40–41). Job knows that his knowledge of God is so little (just the "outskirts" or like a "whisper" (verse 14).

Verse 14
[Job said:] "Behold, these are but the outskirts of his ways,and how small a whisper do we hear of him!But the thunder of his power who can understand?"''
"The outskirts of his ways": in Hebrew literally "the ends of his ways", referring to "the fringes".
"How small a whisper": in Hebrew literally "how little is the word"; with "little" here meaning a "fraction" or an "echo".

See also

Related Bible parts: Genesis 1, Job 4, Job 9, Job 14, Job 15

References

Sources

External links
 Jewish translations:
 Iyov - Job - Chapter 26 (Judaica Press) translation [with Rashi's commentary] at Chabad.org
 Christian translations:
 Online Bible at GospelHall.org (ESV, KJV, Darby, American Standard Version, Bible in Basic English)
 Book of Job Chapter 26. Various versions
  Various versions

26